Vasili Grigoryevich Yanotovsky (born 2 January 1976) is a Russian former footballer.

Career statistics

Club

References

External links
 

1976 births
People from Zabaykalsky Krai
Living people
Russian footballers
FC Tom Tomsk players
Russian Premier League players
Simurq PIK players
Russian expatriate footballers
Expatriate footballers in Azerbaijan
FC SKA-Khabarovsk players
Association football midfielders
Sportspeople from Zabaykalsky Krai